Matilda Anna Ingrid Lutz  (born 28 January 1991 in Milan, Italy) is an Italian model and actress. She starred in the 2017 horror film Rings and action thriller film Revenge. She also appeared in the Netflix series Medici - The Magnificent, Part 1, and in A Classic Horror Story. She will be playing the titular character in the upcoming Red Sonja movie.

Early life
Lutz was born in Milan on 28 January 1991, the daughter of American photographer Elliston Lutz and Italian model Maria Licci.

Filmography

Film

Television

References

External links

1991 births
21st-century Italian actresses
21st-century American actresses
Actresses from Milan
Italian female models
Italian film actresses
Italian television actresses
American female models
American film actresses
American television actresses
Living people
Italian people of German descent
American people of Italian descent
American people of German descent